Alcheringa: An Australasian Journal of Palaeontology is a quarterly peer-reviewed scientific journal covering all aspects of palaeontology and its ramifications into the Earth and biological sciences, especially the disciplines of taxonomy, biostratigraphy, micropalaeontology, vertebrate palaeontology, palaeobotany, palynology, palaeobiology, palaeoanatomy, palaeoecology, biostratinomy, biogeography, chronobiology, biogeochemistry and palichnology. It is the official journal of the Association of Australasian Palaeontologists and is published by Taylor & Francis.

The journal was established in 1975. The name "Alcheringa" is derived from the Arrernte language of the Arrernte Aboriginal people of the Alice Springs area of central Australia, Northern Territory. "Alcheringa" (also spelled altjeringa) is the popularised English version of an Arrernte expression that means "in the beginning" or "from all eternity". Alcheringa is also the name given to a 2.7-2.8 billion-year-old stromatolite from the Pilbara region of Western Australia and symbolises the antiquity of life and its record in sedimentary rocks. An image of the stromatolite is illustrated on the cover of the journal.

Notes

References
Strehlow, T.G.H., 1971. Songs of central Australia. Angus & Robertson, Sydney, liv + 755 pp.
Walter, M.R., 1972. Stromatolites and the biostratigraphy of the Australian Precambrian and Cambrian. Special Papers in Palaeontology 11, i-x + 190 pp., 33 pl.

External links

Paleontology journals
Quarterly journals
Taylor & Francis academic journals
Publications established in 1975
English-language journals